The T. C. Taliaferro House (also known as the Paul T. Ward House) is a historic home in Tampa, Florida. It is located at 305 South Hyde Park.  It was built by architects Grable, Weber & Groves in the Classical Revival style in the late 19th century.  It represents the height of style from 1875 to 1899.

On October 1, 1974, it was added to the U.S. National Register of Historic Places.

The building presently (2017) houses the Helen Gordon Davis Centre for Women.

References

External links
 Hillsborough County listings at National Register of Historic Places
 Florida's Office of Cultural and Historical Programs
 Hillsborough County listings
 Taliaferro House

Houses in Tampa, Florida
History of Tampa, Florida
Houses on the National Register of Historic Places in Hillsborough County, Florida
1890 establishments in Florida